Anacreon was a poet from Ancient Greece.

Anacreon may also refer to:

Persons

 Carl Michael Bellman, sometimes referred to as the Anacreon of Sweden
 Hafez, sometimes referred to as the Anacreon of Persia
 Francesco Albani, sometimes referred to as the Anacreon of Painters
 Bertrand Barère, sometimes referred to as Anacreon of the Guillotine

In media

 Anacréon, the title of two different operatic works written by Jean-Philippe Rameau:
 Anacréon (Rameau, 1754)
 Anacréon, an act added to Rameau's opéra-ballet Les surprises de l'Amour in 1757
 Anacréon (Cherubini), the title of an 1803 opera by Luigi Cherubini
 "To Anacreon in Heaven", the official song of the Anacreontic Society and the melody of the U.S. national anthem, The Star-Spangled Banner
 Anacreon: Reconstruction 4021, a 1988 MS-DOS computer game with a 2004 update
 Anacreon, the name of a planet in the fictional Robot series, Empire series and Foundation series by Isaac Asimov

See also
 Anacreontic Society
 HMS Anacreon